The May Bumps 2000 were a set of rowing races held at Cambridge University from Wednesday 14 June 2000 to Saturday 17 June 2000. The event was run as a bumps race and was the 109th set of races in the series of May Bumps which have been held annually in mid-June since 1887. In 2000, a total of 172 crews took part (103 men's crews and 69 women's crews), with around 1500 participants in total.

Head of the River crews 
  men rowed-over in 1st position, achieving the headship for the 3rd consecutive year.

This is the first year in bumps history that the same club finished Head of the River in both the men's and women's events.

Highest 2nd VIIIs 

Links to races in other years

Bumps Charts 
Below are the bumps charts for the first four men's and women's divisions. The men's bumps charts are on the left, and women's bumps charts on the right. The bumps chart represents the progress of every crew over all four days of the racing. To follow the progress of any particular crew, simply find the crew's name on the left side of the chart and follow the line to the end-of-the-week finishing position on the right of the chart.

References
 Durack, John; Gilbert, George; Marks, Dr. John (2000). The Bumps: An Account of the Cambridge University Bumping Races 1827-1999 

May Bumps results
May Bumps
May Bumps
May Bumps